Africophilus is a genus of beetles in the family Dytiscidae, containing the following species:

 Africophilus bartolozzii Rocchi, 1991
 Africophilus basilewskyi Bilardo, 1976
 Africophilus cesii Sanfilippo & Franciscolo, 1988
 Africophilus congener Omer-Cooper, 1969
 Africophilus differens Omer-Cooper, 1969
 Africophilus inopinatus Guignot, 1948
 Africophilus jansei Omer-Cooper & Joseph Omer-Cooper, 1957
 Africophilus josi Omer-Cooper, 1969
 Africophilus montalentii Sanfilippo & Franciscolo, 1988
 Africophilus nesiotes Guignot, 1951
 Africophilus omercooperae Franciscolo, 1994
 Africophilus pauliani Legros, 1950
 Africophilus sanfilippoi Franciscolo, 1994
 Africophilus sinuaticauda Franciscolo, 1994
 Africophilus stoltzei Holmen, 1985
 Africophilus uzungwai Holmen, 1985
 Africophilus walterrossii Sanfilippo & Franciscolo, 1988

References

Dytiscidae genera